David Beverly may refer to:
David Beverly (1945–2007), killed in the Johnson Space Center shooting
David Beverly (American football) (born 1950), American football player